The Nungali, otherwise known as the Ilngali (Jilngari, Yilngari), are an indigenous Australian people of the Northern Territory.

Name
The name Nungali, now adopted as the general term, differs from the other ethnonym for these people only in having a prefix attached to it.

Language
Nungali is distantly related to Jaminjung and like the latter is one of the non Pama-Nyungan tongues, usually classified as one of the Djamindjungan/Yirram family of languages. It is thought to be virtually extinct.

Alternative names
 Ilngali.
 Jilngali.

Notes

Citations

Sources

Aboriginal peoples of the Northern Territory